is a Japanese singer and actress. She was a member of Cute, a Japanese pop group within Hello! Project.

Early life 
Nakajima was born in Saitama, Japan. She joined Hello! Project in 2002 as one of fifteen children chosen from the Hello! Project Kids auditions after performing "Dekkai Uchuu ni Ai ga Aru" by Morning Musume.

Career 
In 2004, Nakajima did not make the original list of Berryz Kobo and the idea was eventually dropped. The remaining members ending up forming Cute in 2005. The group officially debuted in 2006, with their first official single released in February 2007. Nakajima is a member of Gatas Brilhantes H.P., the Hello! Project futsal team.

In October 2007, Nakajima was placed in the unit Athena & Robikerottsu along with fellow Cute member Chisato Okai, as well as Risa Niigaki and Aika Mitsui of Morning Musume.

In 2009, she was chosen with fellow Hello! Project Kids members Yurina Kumai and Risako Sugaya as well and Aika Mitsui from Morning Musume to be in a newly formed group Guardians 4 formed to sing the openings to the anime Shugo Chara!. She was chosen to be in the 5th-generation Hello Project subgroup PetitmoniV, along with Mai Hagiwara and Erina Mano.

During the Cute Concert Tour 2010 Summer-Fall: Dance Special!! "Chou Uranaito!!", Nakajima injured her leg and was forced to sit out the next concert.

Hello! Project groups and units 
 Hello! Project Kids
 H.P. All Stars (2004)
 Cute (2005–2017)
 Athena & Robikerottsu (2007–?)
 Guardians 4 (2009–2010)
 Hello! Project Mobekimasu (2011)

Satoyama and Satoumi movements
 DIY (2012–present)
 Hi-Fin (2013-?)
 Kamiishinaka Kana (2017)

Discography

Solo DVDs

Appearances

Movies 
 Koinu Dan no Monogatari ("The Story of Puppy Dan") (December 2002) as Chiyori Hoshino
  (2010)
  (December 17, 2011) as Kana Ueda
  (2012)

TV dramas 
 Sūgaku Joshi Gakuen (Ep. 8, February 29, 2012; Ep. 12, March 27, 2012) as Satoko Komaba, the leader of the honor students group

TV shows 
  (2002–2007)
 Cute Has Come (Ep. 5, January 6, 2007; Ep. 6, January 20, 2007)
  (2007–2008)
  (2008)
  (2008–2009)
  (2010–2011)
  (2010–2011)
 Bowling Revolution P-League (February 6, 2011 —)
  (2011–2012)
  (2012–2013)

Radio programs 
 Five Stars (October 6, 2009 — September 27, 2011; Inter FM)
 Nakajima Saki no Cute na Jikan (January 1, 2012 —, Radio Nippon)

Internet 
 Hello! Pro Video Chat (Ep. 22, August 18, 2005)
 Hello! Pro Hour (Ep. 5, April 28, 2006)

Theater plays 
  (2009)
  (2010)
  (2011)
  (2012)
  (2012)
  (2012)

Solo bibliography

Photobooks 
 Nacky (December 10, 2009, Kadokawa Group Publishing)
 W Saki (July 15, 2011, Kadokawa Group Publishing)
  (February 20, 2013, Wani Books)

Digital photobooks
  (September 28, 2010)
 Cutest (Nakky Version) (February 21, 2012)
 W Saki -Black- Vol. 1 (July 1, 2012)
 W Saki -White- Vol. 1 (July 12, 2012)
 W Saki -Black- Vol. 2 (July 24, 2012)
 W Saki -White- Vol. 2 (July 27, 2012)
  (October 22, 2012)

Magazines
 Weekly Famitsu Taiwan Vol. 446 (August 2, 2013)

References

External links 
 Official Hello! Project profile
 Saki Nakajima's official blog 
 Cute official blog 

1994 births
Living people
People from Saitama (city)
Cute (Japanese idol group) members
Hello! Project Kids members
Petitmoni members
Japanese female idols
Japanese radio personalities
Japanese television personalities
Musicians from Saitama Prefecture
21st-century Japanese singers
21st-century Japanese actresses